Claxtonola was a jazz record label founded in 1918 by the Brenard Manufacturing Company in Iowa City, Iowa. It reissued Paramount, Black Swan, and Gennett Records masters on the Claxtonola and National labels. The label closed in 1925. The company also sold phonographs.

Discography
The company's recordings include:

The Wolverines:
Oh Baby 
Copenhagen
Susie 
Riverboat Shuffle 
Sensation 
Lazy Daddy

The Bucktown Five: 
Hot Mittens

Hitch's Happy Harmonists:
Steady Steppin' Papa

Midway Gardens Orchestra:
Tin Roof Blues 
Black Sheep Blues 
Lots 0' Mama 
Sobbin' Blues

Fletcher Henderson, on National:
Aunt Hagar's Children
My Sweetie Went Away

Jelly Roll Morton, on National:
Muddy Water Blues
Sam Ash
When Shall We Meet Again (4007-A)
Charles Harrison
That's How I Believe in You(4007-B)

References

American record labels
Pop record labels
Rock record labels
Companies based in Iowa
Jazz record labels